Xavier de Mérode (Frédéric François Xavier Ghislain; Brussels, 1820 – Rome, 1874) was a Belgian prelate, archbishop and statesman of the Papal states.

Biography

Xavier de Mérode was the son of Count Félix de Mérode-Westerloo, who held in turn the portfolios of foreign affairs, war, and finances under Leopold I of Belgium, and of Rosalie de Grammont. He was allied through the House of Mérode to the aristocracy of France. He lost his mother at the age of three and was raised at Villersexel, in Franche-Comté, by his aunt Philippine de Grammont, Xavier was the brother-in-law of Charles Forbes René de Montalembert, and the grand-nephew of Gilbert du Motier, Marquis de Lafayette.

After attending the Jesuit High School of Namur for a time, he entered the Collège de Juilly presided over by de Salinis and then beginning in 1839 the Military Academy of Brussels. He graduated with the rank of second lieutenant, In 1844, after a short period serving at the armoury of Liège, he joined the staff of Maréchal Bugeaud in Algeria as foreign attaché and in his service in action against the Kabyle, won the cross of the Légion d'honneur.

In 1847, he abruptly abandoned his military career and went to study for the priesthood at the Gregorian University in Rome, where he was ordained in September 1849. There he became friends with Count de Woelmont. The Roman Republic was declared in February 1849. The Republic was openly hostile to the Catholic Church, celebrating Good Friday with huge fireworks on Saint Peter's Plaza and desecrating Saint Peter's Basilica on Easter Sunday with a secular Republican victory celebration. Pope Pius IX responded from his exile in Gaeta by excommunicating all active participants. Despite the danger, Mérode did not hesitate to go and plaster, in broad daylight, at the door of the churches, the bull of excommunication.

He was assigned after his ordination as chaplain to the French garrison of Viterbo. In 1850, while his family was urging him to return to Belgium, Pope Pius IX, with a view to attach him permanently to his court, made him cameriere segreto, an office which entailed the direction of the Roman prisons. Historians have documented Mérode's efforts for the penitentiary system in Rome. Mérode adapted some of the concepts of Belgian reformer Édouard Ducpétiaux. He brought from Mechelen some Brothers of Mercy of Our Lady of Perpetual Help, founded in 1839 by Canon J. B. Cornelius Scheppers, for the instruction and care of prisoners and of the sick. The French envoy at Rome, Alphonse de Rayneval, praised his work in an official report to his government; Gioacchino Pecci, Archbishop of Perugia, wanted de Mérode to undertake similar work in his jurisdiction.

In 1860 Mérode, much against the views of the Roman Prelature, headed by Cardinal Antonelli, persuaded Pius IX to form a corps of Catholic volunteers that later became the Papal Zouaves. The Zouaves evolved out of a unit formed by Christophe Léon Louis Juchault de Lamoricière, the Franco-Belgian Tirailleurs. Mérode succeeded in enlisting the services of Lamoricière as commander-in-chief and was himself appointed minister of war. The Almoner was Mgr. Woelmont. The task assumed by Mérode and Lamoricière was well-nigh impossible.

Mérode devoted the ensuing years to public works. He paid for the construction of the Campo pretoriano outside the Porta Pia, the clearing of the approaches to Santa Maria degli Angeli, the opening of streets in the new section of Rome, the sanitation of the old quarters by the Tiber, and other projects. His temperament and progressive views made him enemies among the more traditional quarters of Roman society. He attacked the French Emperor's duplicity, making enemies of the leadership of the French army of occupation. Lamoricière's death on 19 September 1865 allowed for hostilities to come into the open and Pius IX was forced to discharge him, leaving him only the title of a simple cameriere.

Mérode, on Hohenlohe's promotion to the rank of cardinal, was named Papal Almoner and on 22 June 1866 consecrated archbishop with the titular see of Melitene. His new duties were to distribute the papal alms and to confirm children in danger of death. He created free medical consultations and a pharmacy. At the First Vatican Council, he showed the influence exercised over him by his brother-in-law de Montalembert and sided with the minority that deemed the definition of papal infallibility inopportune and even dangerous, but submitted the day the dogma was defined.

After the capture of Rome by the Piedmontese on 20 September 1870), he joined the Pope in retirement within the Vatican, leaving only to fight the Piedmontese government's pretensions on the Campo pretoriano or to share de Rossi's work in the excavations of Tor Marancino, which resulted in the discovery of the old Basilica of St. Petronilla.

He died of acute pneumonia at the age of fifty-four, only a few months before the consistory in which he was to be made a cardinal. His remains were laid to rest in the Teutonic Cemetery.

See also
 House of Merode

Notes

References
Attribution
 This entry cites:
Lamy, Monseigneur de Mérode (Louvain, 1874);
Besson, F. F. X. de Mérode, sa vie et ses œuvres (Paris, 1886);
Le Poitevin, Mgr. de Mérode in Les Contemporains (Paris, s. d.);

1820 births
1874 deaths
Belgian Roman Catholic archbishops
Roman Catholic titular archbishops
Belgian Roman Catholic titular bishops
Xa
Belgian soldiers
Deaths from pneumonia in Lazio